Argon fluorohydride (systematically named fluoridohydridoargon) or argon hydrofluoride is an inorganic compound with the chemical formula HArF (also written ArHF). It is a compound of the chemical element argon.

Discovery 

The discovery of this argon compound is credited to a group of Finnish scientists, led by Markku Räsänen.  On 24 August 2000, in the journal Nature, they announced their discovery of argon fluorohydride. This discovery caused the recognition that argon could form weakly bound compounds, even though it was not the first.

Synthesis 

This chemical was synthesized by mixing argon and hydrogen fluoride on a caesium iodide surface at 8 K (−265 °C), and exposing the mixture to ultraviolet radiation. This caused the gases to combine.

The infrared spectrum of the resulting gas mixture shows that it definitely contains chemical bonds, albeit very weak ones; thus, it is argon fluorohydride, and not a supermolecule or a mixture of argon and hydrogen fluoride. Its chemical bonds are stable only if the substance is kept at temperatures below 27 K (−246 °C); upon warming, it decomposes into argon and hydrogen fluoride.

References

Further reading 

Fluorides
Nonmetal halides
Argon compounds
Hydrogen compounds
Triatomic molecules
Fluorine compounds
Substances discovered in the 2000s